Tripteroides (Rachionotomyia) affinis is a species of zoophilic mosquito belonging to the genus Tripteroides. It is found in India, Sri Lanka and Thailand.

References

External links
Distributional and Biological Notes on Mosquitoes from Sri Lanka

affinis